Aviano Middle/High School (previously Aviano American High School) is a Department of Defense Education Activity secondary school located on the Italian owned NATO Air Base in Aviano, Italy which hosts the 31st Fighter Wing. The majority of students are dependents of active duty military personnel, DoD employees, contractors and  diplomats, although a small percentage are children of other English speaking expatriates or local Italian residents.

As of the 2008–2009 school year Aviano Middle School and Aviano High School were joined into one school serving grades 6-12. It is classified as a Division II school in DoDDS Europe.

The school's mascot is the saint.

History
The current building began operations in 2002.

Athletics
The athletic program at Aviano Middle/High School is open to high school students and some middle school students. Competitions take place throughout the year in the DoDDS Europe Division II league as well as the American International Schools Italian League. Athletes follow the DoDDS Europe athletic code.

Fall
Football
Cross country
Volleyball Women
Volleyball Men
Tennis
Cheerleading
Swimming (community sponsored)

Winter
Basketball Men and Women
Wrestling
Cheerleading 
Swimming (community sponsored)
Air Force JROTC drill team (AFJROTC sponsored)

Spring
Track and field
Softball
Baseball
Soccer Men and Women

Extracurricular
Clubs, organizations, and events exist for students to join or take part in:

Academic Bowl
Air Force JROTC (offered as a class)
Air Force JROTC Drill Team
Book Club
Cisco (offered as a class)
Creative Connections
Drama/Theatre
Future Business Leaders of America (FBLA)
Future Educators Association (FEA)
Future Educators Association Honor Society (must be selected to join)
Hinterbrand outdoors club
International Leadership Institute (ISLI)
Lingua Fest Language Festival
Math Counts
Model U.S. Senate
National Honors Society (must be selected to join)
National Junior Honor Society (must be selected to join)
Peer Mediation
Robotics Club
Student 2 Student
Student newspaper (offered as a class)
Tutoring
Yearbook (offered as a class)

Student government
The purpose of the student government at Aviano is to provide everyone with a chance to have a say in what goes on in the student body. The student government acts as advocates to the administration on behalf of students. They  also organize school events such as pep rallies and dances. Each office is headed by a President, Vice President, Secretary, Treasurer, and a Public Relations officer.

Executive Office - Serves as main advocates for the school, handles school wide issues. Officers are elected by the students.
Senior Class - Handles senior issues and events including graduation. Officers are elected by 12th grade students
Junior Class - Organizes the Junior and Senior Prom, handles Junior issues, officers are elected by 11th grade students
Sophomore Class - Handles Sophomore issues, officers are elected by 10th grade students
Freshmen Class - Handles Freshmen issues, officers are elected by 9th grade students

Advanced/Accelerated and International Baccalaureate (IB) courses
Aviano Middle/High School offers Honors and Advanced Placement (AP) courses for high school students.

English
 Honors English(9th)
 Honors World Literature (10th) - Joint with Honors World Hist
 AP Language and Composition (11th)
 AP English Literature (12th)

History/Social Studies
 Honors History (9th)
 Honors World History (10th) - Joint with Honors World Lit
 AP U.S. History (11th-12th)
 AP Government (11th-12th)

Math
 AP Calculus
 AP Statistics

Science
 AP Biology
 AP Human Anatomy and Physiology

Other
 AP Psychology
 AP Economics
  There are online AP courses

International Baccalaureate
 IB courses are available and offered online

The Honors World Literature and History classes are combined classes. Students who take one must take the other and receive a joint performance grade that is averaged together.

The AP classes are weighted grades on a student's GPA.

See also
Vicenza American High School
Naples American High School
American Overseas School of Rome
Marymount International School of Rome
American School of Milan
Aviano Air Base
Military brats
DODDS European Championships
List of high schools in U.S. territories

References

 http://www.dodea.edu/AvianoMHS/

Schools in Friuli-Venezia Giulia
Department of Defense Education Activity
Secondary schools in Italy
American international schools in Italy